Last Seen Wearing ... (1952) is a detective novel by Hillary Waugh frequently referred to as the police procedural par excellence. Set in a fictional college town in Massachusetts, the book is about a female freshman who goes missing and the painstaking investigation carried out by the police with the aim of finding out what has happened to her.

Plot 
"The police examine her past for any motive that might make her wish to disappear, or any reason why someone might want to kill her. They find her body after a long and frustrating search. As they sift all the evidence again and again, the identity of her killer slowly begins to emerge, like a photograph taking on recognizable features in the developing fluid" (Ian Ousby).

The novel, which minutely chronicles the work of the police, is told in chronological order. No piece of information is ever held back. At any given point in time, the reader knows just as much as the police. The time narrated is 5½ weeks, from 3 March 1950 to 11 April 1950.

Sources
It is generally accepted that the novel is based on the true case of the December 1, 1946, vanishing of a Bennington College coed, 18-year-old Stamford, Connecticut, resident Paula Jean Welden, while hiking the Long Trail in the Green Mountains near Bennington, Vermont.
That case has never been solved. It resulted, however, in the creation of Vermont state police force which did not exist at the time of the disappearance.

References
 Reginald Hill: "Introduction" to the 1999 Pan edition of the novel (No.10 of the "Pan Classic Crime" series).
 Ian Ousby: The Crime and Mystery Book. A Reader's Companion (London, 1997) 139.
 Julian Symons: Bloody Murder. From the Detective Story to the Crime Novel: A History (1972) ("If a single book had to be chosen to show the possibilities in the police novel which are outside most crime fiction, no better example could be found than Last Seen Wearing ...").
 T. J. Binyon: "Murder Will Out". The Detective in Fiction (OUP, 1990) ("one of the best police novels so far written").
 In The Hatchards Crime Companion. 100 Top Crime Novels Selected By the Crime Writers' Association, ed. Susan Moody (London, 1990), Last Seen Wearing ... is in 12th place of members' all-time favourites and in first place in the police procedural category.
 The Crown Crime Companion. The Top 100 Mystery Novels of All Time Selected by the Mystery Writers of America (New York, 1995) sees Last Seen Wearing ...in 74th place and in sixth place in the police procedural category.

1952 American novels
American crime novels
Novels set in Massachusetts
Doubleday (publisher) books
Works about missing people